Archery at the 2018 Asian Para Games was held in Jakarta between 10 and 11 October 2018.

Medal table

Medalists

Men

Women

Mixed

See also
Archery at the 2017 ASEAN Para Games
Archery at the 2018 Asian Games

References

External links
 Archery - Asian Para Games 2018
 RESULT SYSTEM - ASIAN PARA GAMES JAKARTA 2018

2018 Asian Para Games events